The Al-Badr was a paramilitary force composed mainly of Bihari Muslims which operated in East Pakistan against the Bengali nationalist movement during the Bangladesh Liberation War, under the patronage of the Pakistani government.

Etymology
The name Al-Badr means the full moon and refers to the Battle of Badr.

History

Organization
Al-Badr was constituted in September 1971 under the auspices of General Amir Abdullah Khan Niazi, then chief of the Pakistan Army eastern command.  Members of Al-Badr were recruited from public schools and madrasas (religious schools).  The unit was used for raids and special operations; the Pakistan army command initially planned to use locally recruited militias (Al-Badr, Razakar, Al-Shams) for policing cities of East Pakistan, and regular army units to defend the border with India. According to Brigadier Abdul Rahman Siddiqi, members of Al-Badr were mainly Biharis.

Despite their similarities in opposing the independence of Bangladesh, the Razakar and Al-Badr had differences; Razakars opposed the Mukti Bahini in general, while Al-Badr's tactics were terrorism and political killings.  All three groups operated under Pakistani command.

Dissolution
After the surrender of the Pakistan Army on 16 December 1971, Al-Badr was dissolved together with the Razakar and Al-Shams.  Many members were arrested.  During the time of president Sheikh Mujibur Rahman, all of the collaborators, including those of Al-Badr were pardoned and in 1975 any attempt to try them was repealed.

War crimes
Al-Badr perpetrated atrocities against civilians during the war of 1971, in particular, the massacre of intellectuals that occurred in the Rayer Bazaar area of Dhaka on 15 December 1971.
According to journalist Azadur Rahman Chandan, Al-Badr was experimentally launched in Jamalpur, Mymensingh in April 1971 as a voluntary force with Islami Chhatra Shangha activists as its first recruits to wage war against the nationalist fighters. They were enlisted and trained under the guidance of Mohammad Kamaruzzaman, the assistant secretary general of Jamaat.

Leaders of Al-Badr
 Motiur Rahman Nizami was convicted of war crimes and executed on 11 May 2016
 Mir Quasem Ali was convicted of war crimes and executed on 3 September 2016
 Ashrafuz Zaman Khan
 Chowdhury Mueen-Uddin
 Ali Ahsan Mohammad Mojaheed was convicted of war crimes and executed on 22 November 2015.

See also
 Peace Committee

References

Bangladesh Liberation War
Bangladesh Jamaat-e-Islami
Former paramilitary forces of Pakistan